Amanita Design is a Czech independent video game developing company founded in 2003 by Jakub Dvorský and headquartered in Brno, Czech Republic. The company has created award-winning games including Machinarium, the Samorost series and Botanicula, as well as educational and advertising minigames and animations, all using Adobe Flash. Clients include BBC, Nike and The Polyphonic Spree.

History
Samorost 2 has won the Webby Award. In 2009, Amanita Design released the award-winning game Machinarium. Botanicula was released in April 2012 as both a standalone purchase as well as the subject of the Humble Botanicula Debut. On 24 March 2016, they released Samorost 3 (the follow-up to Samorost 2). The studio's eleventh project was Chuchel, which was released on 7 March 2018.

On 18 May 2022, they announced a development of their first 3D adventure game - Phonopolis, featuring hand-crafted assets and traditional 12 FPS stop-motion animation.

Games

Side projects 
 Vespering - music video for DVA by Jaromír Plachý (2016)
 Mulatu - music video for DVA by Jaromír Plachý (2013)
 Zorya - music album by Floex (2011)
 Kooky - puppet feature film and book by Jakub Dvorský (2010)
 Nunovó Tango - music video for DVA by Jaromír Plachý (2009)
 Plantage - music video for Under Byen by Jakub Dvorský (2004)
 Na tu svatbu - music video for Kamil Jasmín by Václav Blín (2002)
 Nusle - short film (2001)
 Psyride - psytrance music video (2001)
 Blanka Šperková - flash website by Jakub Dvorský
 Podvědomím - flash website by Jakub Dvorský
 Pantry - web toy by Jakub Dvorský

Team members and collaborators 

 Jakub Dvorský (game designer, graphic artist, Amanita Design founder and CEO)
 Jaromír Plachý (game designer, animator, graphic artist)
 Václav Blín (animator, graphic artist)
  (graphic artist, painter, sculptor)
 Tomáš Dvořák (Floex) (musician)
 Tomáš Dvořák (Pif) (sound effects designer, production assistant, CFO)
 DVA (musicians) - Bára Ungerová and Jan Kratochvíl
 David Oliva (programmer)
 Jan Werner (programmer)
 Peter Stehlík (programmer)

Awards 
Chuchel
 Annual Independent Games Festival - Excellence in Visual Art (2018)
 Annual Independent Games Festival - Excellence in Audio Award - nominee (2018)
 Adventure Gamers - The Aggie Awards - Best Character, Animation and Sound Effects (2018) 
Samorost 3
 Annual Independent Games Festival - Excellence in Visual Art - nominee (2014)
 Annual Independent Games Festival - Excellence in Audio Award - nominee (2014)
 Adventure Gamers - The Aggie Awards - Best Non-Traditional Adventure (2016) 
Botanicula
 IndieCade - Story / World Design Award (2012)
 Annual Independent Games Festival - Excellence in Audio Award (2012)
 Annual Independent Games Festival - Excellence in Visual Art - nominee (2012)
 Adventure Gamers - The Aggie Awards - Best Animation (2012) 
Machinarium
 Annual Independent Games Festival - Excellence in Visual Art Award (2009)
 DICE Awards - Nomination for 13th Annual Interactive Achievement Awards (2009)
 Gamasutra - Best Indie Game of 2009
 VGChartz.com - Best Indie Game of 2009
 PC Gamer - Best Soundtrack of 2009
Questionaut
 British Academy Award (BAFTA) - nominee (2009)
 Mochis Award - Best Game Art (2009)
Samorost 2
 Flashforward Film Festival - winner in Original Sound category (2006)
 Seoul net festival - Best Web-Work Award (2006)
 Webby Award - winner in games category (2007)
 Annual Independent Games Festival - Best Web Browser Game (2007)
Samorost
 Top Talent Award - nominee (2003)
 Webby Award - nominee (2004)

References

External links 
Amanita Design homepage
Blog

Video game development companies
Video game companies of the Czech Republic
Video game companies established in 2003
Companies based in Brno
Czech companies established in 2003